is a Japanese female pop singer and gravure idol. She made her debut in 2005 Miss Young Jump, winning Tsunku's honorable award.

She started acting as a child actress using her former stage names, Sachie Komatsu and Hikaru Asakura.

She featured as "Amimi" in the 2007 Tsunku produced female trio "Gyaruru", together with Asami Abe and Natsuko "Gal" Sone.

Singles 
  (Opening song for School Rumble – Second Term)

External links 
 old Official profile 
 Official blog 
 Official profile 

Living people
Japanese television personalities
Japanese gravure models
Japanese actresses
1987 births
Singers from Tokyo
21st-century Japanese singers